Andrew Hallidie may refer to:

Andrew Halliday (physician), or Andrew Hallidie, royal physician to King William IV and Queen Victoria
Andrew Smith Hallidie, promoter of the first line of the San Francisco cable car system

See also
 Andrew Halliday (disambiguation)